= Geology of Transnistria =

The geology of Transnistria includes some of the region's rare exposures of rock from before the Neogene along the Dniester River. The area is underlain by East European Platform rocks from the Precambrian, including granite, gneiss and gabbro from the Archean and Paleozoic. Paleozoic rocks are overlain by Triassic and Jurassic conglomerate, sandstone, siltstone and limestone that lack fossils. Quaternary deposits from the last 2.5 million years cover almost the entire country.
